Jeanie Lang (born Mary Eugenia Wirick) was an American actress, mostly known for having a lead role in the 1930 color film King of Jazz.

She was born on December 17, 1911 in Maplewood, Missouri, USA. She was an actress and singer and played in King of Jazz (1930) where she sings with Paul Whiteman and his orchestra (Ragamuffin Romeo, I Like to Do Things for You), and in the shorts Freshman Love (1931) and The Way of All Freshmen (1933). She was married to Arthur C. Langkamer (Lang) who died in 1986. She died on September 19, 1993 in Broward, Florida, USA.

External links

 

1911 births
1993 deaths
American actresses
20th-century American singers
20th-century American women singers